Heylerosauridae is a family of mastodonsauroid temnospondyls. It was first named in 1980 to include the genera Odenwaldia and Quasicyclotosaurus. In addition to these genera, the family now includes Eocyclotosaurus and Yuanansuchus. Recent phylogenetic analyses have not found a close relationship between Odenwaldia and other heylerosaurids and place it outside the family. Heylerosaurids are generally regarded as the sister taxon of the stenotosaurids.

References

Triassic temnospondyls
Middle Triassic first appearances
Late Triassic extinctions